Daugavpils Fortress, also known as Dinaburg Fortress or Dvinsk Fortress, is an early 19th century  fortress in Daugavpils, Latvia. It is the only early 19th century military fortification of its kind in Northern Europe that has been preserved without significant alterations. The construction of the fortress began in 1810 by decree of Tsar Alexander I of Russia, in the atmosphere of increased tension before Napoleon's invasion of the Russian Empire in 1812. Construction of the fortress, due to Napoleon's invasion, lengthy delays, serious floodings and slow construction work, was fully completed only in 1878.

The Mark Rothko Art centre is located in the former Artillery arsenal.

History

About 10,000 workers built the fortress in two shifts. In 1812, the fortress was attacked by a detachment of the French Army of 24,000 men. The fortress was still under construction and was defended by 3300 men with 200 cannons. The fortress was a significant modern military centre of the Russian Empire, for a long time being a defense base of the western frontier of the Russian Empire. The direct route taken by Russian nobles and Royalty from St. Petersburg (then capital of the Russian Empire) to Europe led right through the city of Daugavpils (then named Dinaburg), and Daugavpils Fortress was the place of rest for many nobles including tsars Alexander I, Nicolas I, Alexander II, Alexander III and Russia's last tsar Nicolas II.

Latvian independence was officially recognised by Soviet Russia in 1920, and between 1920 and 1940 the fortress became home of the Latvian army. During World War II, the camp for Soviet prisoners of war Stalag 340 was set up by German army in the fortress. The fortress' Baroque Jesuit church constructed from 1737-1746 was destroyed during the War.

In 1948–1993, the fortress was home to the Daugavpils Higher School of Military Aircraft Engineering (DVVAIU). In 1998 the fortress came under the authority of the State Real Estate Agency of Latvia. In 2004 the Cabinet of Ministers of the Republic of Latvia decided to sell the fortress either in parts or as one whole. The fortress's future remains uncertain.

Gallery

See also
 List of Jesuit sites

References

External links

 Urban-travel.org @ The Dinaburg Fortress

Fortifications in Latvia
Daugavpils
Star forts